Chancellor Simon Péchi  (1575–1642) was a Hungarian Székely official, and wealthy supporter of Matthias Vehe and nobleman András Eőssi's Szekler Sabbatarians movement in Transylvania. The influence of Péchi's Sabbatarian prayer book contributed to the conversion of around twenty thousand Székelys to Sabbatarianism in the late sixteenth century. Samuel Kohn, Chief Rabbi of Budapest, and the first scholar to take an interest in the Sabbatarians among the Transylvanian unitarians, published a biography of Péchi as part of his studies in 1899.

Works
 Atyák mondásai — Pirqé ávot

References

1575 births
1642 deaths
Szekler Sabbatarians
Chancellors of Transylvania
People from Pécs